Scott Township is a township in Champaign County, Illinois, USA.  As of the 2020 census, its population was 999 and it contained 456 housing units.

History
Scott Township was formed when Middletown Township was split on an unknown date.

Geography
Scott is Township 19 North, Range 7 East of the Third Principal Meridian.

The stream of South Fork Camp Creek runs through this township.

Demographics
As of the 2020 census there were 999 people, 447 households, and 301 families residing in the township. The racial makeup of the township was 88.49% White, 1.80% African American, 0.20% Native American, 0.30% Asian, 0.00% Pacific Islander, 1.30% from other races, and 7.91% from two or more races. Hispanic or Latino of any race were 2.70% of the population.

There were 447 households, out of which 32.70% had children under the age of 18 living with them, 61.07% were married couples living together, 2.46% had a female householder with no spouse present, and 32.66% were non-families. 22.40% of all households were made up of individuals, and 6.70% had someone living alone who was 65 years of age or older. The average household size was 2.48 and the average family size was 2.95.

The township's age distribution consisted of 18.3% under the age of 18, 8.2% from 18 to 24, 20.1% from 25 to 44, 33.9% from 45 to 64, and 19.5% who were 65 years of age or older. The median age was 47.5 years. For every 100 females, there were 111.4 males. For every 100 females age 18 and over, there were 89.4 males.

The median income for a household in the township was $94,375, and the median income for a family was $142,549. Males had a median income of $56,024 versus $42,396 for females. The per capita income for the township was $41,921. About 2.7% of families and 5.2% of the population were below the poverty line, including none of those under age 18 and 4.1% of those age 65 or over.

Road Commissioner
The current road commissioner in Scott Township is Jeff Sebens.

Cities and towns
 Bondville

Unincorporated towns
 Seymour
(This list is based on USGS data and may include former settlements.)

Major highways
  Interstate 72
  Illinois State Route 10
  Illinois State Route 47

Airports and landing strips
 Igoe Heliport
 Litchfield RLA Airport

References
 
 United States Census Bureau cartographic boundary files

External links
 US-Counties.com
 City-Data.com
 Illinois State Archives
 Early history of Scott Township, Illinois

Townships in Champaign County, Illinois
Townships in Illinois